The 1933 Palestine Cup (HaGavia HaEretz-Israeli) was the fifth season of Israeli Football Association's nationwide football cup competition. The defending holders, British Police, didn't take part in the competition.

For the first time, all team participating were Jewish clubs, as British and Arab teams declined to enter. Maccabi Tel Aviv and Hapoel Tel Aviv met in the final, the former winning the cup by a single goal.

Results

First round

Quarter-finals

Replay

Semi-finals

Final

Notes

References
100 Years of Football 1906–2006, Elisha Shohat (Israel), 2006

External links
 Israel Football Association website 

Israel State Cup
Cup
Israel State Cup seasons